The County of Novellara and Bagnolo (Italian: Contea di Novellara e Bagnolo) was an independent state which existed in Northern Italy from 1371 to 1728. It was ruled for some three centuries and a half by the Gonzaga of Novellara branch of the eponymous large Italian noble family.

History
The state originated in 1371 when Feltrino Gonzaga, lord of Reggio and leader of the anti-Visconti coalition, was forced to sell Reggio to Barnabò Visconti, and retired to Novellara. His son Guido started to fortify the town.

The fief was not large, and was divided into two separate zones encompassing the modern comuni of Novellara and Bagnolo in Piano. In 1501 the original lordship received the title of Imperial County, and in the same century the castle was turned into a noble palace. The last Gonzaga lord was Filippo Alfonso Gonzaga, who died on 12 October 1728; his lands were returned to Charles VII of Austria, who assigned them to the Duchy of Modena under the House of Este in 1737.

Sources

Novellara
Novellara
Novellara
Novellara
Duchy of Modena and Reggio